Neha Jhulka is an Indian Film and TV actress. She mainly appeared in South Indian Films as well as Bollywood and Telugu Movies.she started her acting career in 2007 with the Telugu movie Okkadunnadu. in the same year, she played in the Telugu movie Viyyala Vari Kayyalu and the Bollywood movie Kaisay Kahein. Neha Jhulka also appeared in two television serials; Dill Mill Gayye and Geet – Hui Sabse Parayi.
Web series
Happy Family:conditions apply "Diana" 
"2022"

Filmography

Films

TV Shows
Dill Mill Gayye as Dr. Naina
Geet - Hui Sabse Parayi as Pari
Saas Bina Sasural as Divya

Music Videos
Chal Hun, Malkit Singh, King of Bhangra... Female Lead
''Kya Tujhe Pata Hai, Abhijeet Sawant- Female Lead

References

External links

Actresses in Telugu cinema
Indian film actresses
Living people
Actresses in Hindi cinema
Actresses in Assamese cinema
Actresses in Hindi television
Indian television actresses
21st-century Indian actresses
Year of birth missing (living people)